Tomasz Nowak (born 30 October 1985) is a Polish professional footballer who plays as a midfielder for Rekord Bielsko-Biała.

Club career

Korona Kielce
Nowak joined Korona Kielce in the 2006–07 winter break from Kania Gostyń. For the 2009–10 season he was loaned to Polonia Bytom.

Górnik Łęczna
In February 2011, he joined Górnik Łęczna on a half year deal.

ŁKS Łódź
On 13 June 2011, Nowak joined Polish Ekstraklasa side ŁKS Łódź on a free transfer from Górnik Łęczna. He signed a two-year deal.

Podbeskidzie
Ahead of the 2019–20 season, Nowak joined Podbeskidzie Bielsko-Biała.

International career
Nowak was a part of Poland national team, for which he has played three times and scored one goal.

References

External links
 
 
 

1985 births
Living people
People from Kościan
Sportspeople from Greater Poland Voivodeship
Polish footballers
Association football midfielders
Polish expatriate footballers
Expatriate footballers in Belarus
Polish expatriate sportspeople in Belarus
Ekstraklasa players
I liga players
III liga players
Belarusian Premier League players
Amica Wronki players
Kania Gostyń players
Korona Kielce players
Polonia Bytom players
Górnik Łęczna players
ŁKS Łódź players
FC Gomel players
Zagłębie Sosnowiec players
Podbeskidzie Bielsko-Biała players
Poland international footballers